The Sarasota Observer is one of twelve community and business publications published by The Observer Group, which was formed in 1995, and whose headquarters are located in Sarasota, Florida. Established in 2004 to serve downtown Sarasota, the weekly publication joined the family of hyper-local newspapers in the region which in 2012 changed its name to the Observer Media Group.

As of 2019, the Sarasota Observer has a circulation of 24,175 and is distributed weekly on Thursdays.

References

External links

Newspapers published in Florida
Publications established in 2004
Sarasota, Florida
2004 establishments in Florida
Weekly newspapers published in the United States